Hare Splitter is a 1948 Warner Bros. Merrie Melodies animated short directed by Friz Freleng. The short was released on September 25, 1948, and features Bugs Bunny. The title is a play on "hair splitting", or focusing too much on fine details, reflecting how Bugs (a "hare") tries to "split up" Casbah and Daisy Lou so Bugs can date her himself.

Plot
Bugs Bunny and his next door neighbor, Casbah, are preparing to go on a date with Daisy Lou, but a fight for Daisy Lou begins as soon as Casbah and Bugs exit their rabbit holes. Bugs and Casbah both leave their holes with flowers for Daisy Lou. Seeing each other's gifts, they try to outdo each other with bigger and better gifts. Bugs finally throws an anvil on Casbah’s head to get rid of him.

When Bugs arrives at Daisy Lou’s home, he finds a note on her door saying she went shopping and will be back shortly (The fact that Daisy Lou lives in a house instead of a rabbit hole like Bugs or Casbah is an oddity that goes unremarked upon.). Bugs sees Casbah coming and dresses up as Daisy Lou. He lures Casbah over to the porch swing and starts flirting with him. When Casbah isn’t looking, Bugs hits him over the head, puts a mouse trap down, and gives him an explosive carrot.

In addition to tricking Casbah on the swing, Bugs pretends to kiss Casbah by using a plunger and hitting him on the head. He continues tricking Casbah by painting a bomb to look like Daisy Lou.

Casbah is so excited by explosion of the bomb, he accidentally runs into the house. Once again, Bugs tries to trick Casbah by pretending to be Mr. Daniel Cupid and shooting him with an arrow. Casbah becomes enraged and finally sees through Bugs' disguise ("You can't fool me no more! I KNOW who you are! You're that screwy rabbit!" he shouts, clearly not realizing this description applies just as well to himself). Bugs tries to get Casbah out of hitting him by donning a pair of glasses ("You wouldn't hit a guy with glasses, would ya?"), but Casbah still punches him in the face, breaking the glasses and making Bugs realize he's angered Casbah ("Ya know? I believe he would"). Casbah then chases Bugs as he is now on the warpath against Bugs, who manages to escape into Daisy Lou's house and slam the door on Casbah's face.

Bugs sees Daisy Lou coming home and runs around the side of the house. Casbah sees Daisy Lou coming up the porch and thinks it is again Bugs dressed up as her. When Daisy Lou enters the house, Casbah hits her upside the head with a giant vase. Daisy Lou screams and, by the sound of it, proceeds to assault Casbah with every single vase in the house, throwing the last one after him as he flees.

The cartoon ends with Bugs showering Daisy Lou with compliments and kissing Daisy Lou after she has eaten an explosive carrot. Both Bugs and Daisy Lou think the explosive effect the carrot lends to the kiss is due to the other's romantic capabilities ("What a man!"/ "What a woman"), and they hop wildly and enthusiastically kiss again.

See also
 Lola Bunny

References

External links
 

1948 films
1948 short films
1948 animated films
Merrie Melodies short films
Cross-dressing in American films
Short films directed by Friz Freleng
Films scored by Carl Stalling
Bugs Bunny films
1940s Warner Bros. animated short films